Danilo Ostojić (born 11 May 1996) is a Serbian professional basketball player for ZTE KK of the Hungarian League.

Early career 
Ostojić grew up with Crvena zvezda youth teams. He won 2014 Euroleague NIJT.

Professional career 
He signed his first professional contract for Crvena zvezda in May 2014. In August 2018, he signed for Dynamic Belgrade.

On April 2, 2021, Ostojić signed with Greek club Charilaos Trikoupis.

On May 25, 2021, he has signed with HydroTruck Radom of the PLK.

References

External links
 Profile at eurobasket.com
 Profile at euroleague.net
 Profile at FIBA

1996 births
Living people
ABA League players
Basketball League of Serbia players
Basketball players from Belgrade
Charilaos Trikoupis B.C. players
KK Crvena zvezda youth players
KK Dynamic players
KK FMP players
KK Metalac Valjevo players
KK Vršac players
Serbian expatriate basketball people in Greece
Serbian expatriate basketball people in Hungary
Serbian expatriate basketball people in Poland
Serbian men's basketball players
Small forwards